Don Tatro is an American businessman and politician who served as a member of the Nevada Senate for the 16th district. Tatro was appointed to the role in November 2021, succeeding Ben Kieckhefer.

Early life and education 
Tatro was born and raised in Carson City, Nevada. He earned a Bachelor of Science degree in business management from the University of Phoenix.

Career 
Tatro has served as a press secretary for Senator John Ensign and Tom Coburn. From February 2015 to November 2020, he was the executive director of the Builders Association of Northern Nevada, tasked with lobbying the Nevada Legislature. Tatro also owns a mortgage lending business. 

Tatro was appointed to the Nevada Senate in November 2021. In February 2022, he announced that he would seek a full term in the Nevada Senate in the November election. In the June 2022 Republican primary, Tatro was defeated by Assemblywoman Lisa Krasner.

References 

Living people
Nevada Republicans
Businesspeople from Nevada
University of Phoenix alumni
People from Carson City, Nevada
People from Reno, Nevada
Year of birth missing (living people)